The  2015 Quetta bus bombing  occurred on 19 October 2015 in Quetta a city in Balochistan. The blast killed at least 11 people and another 22 were injured.

See also
 2014 Mastung bus bombing
 2015 Karachi bus shooting
 List of terrorist incidents, 2015
 Terrorist incidents in Pakistan in 2015

References

2015 murders in Pakistan
21st-century mass murder in Pakistan
Improvised explosive device bombings in Pakistan
Crime in Balochistan, Pakistan
Terrorist incidents in Quetta
Mass murder in 2015
Massacres in Pakistan
Terrorist incidents in Pakistan in 2015
Violence against Shia Muslims in Pakistan